"At the Moving Picture Ball" is a popular song composed by Joseph H. Santly (né Joseph Harry Santly; 1886–1962) and recorded by many artists during the silent film era. Today the song is best remembered for its unusually topical lyrics, which mention many celebrities of the time. In fact, by 1920, the lyrics of the song had already been changed, since several celebrities mentioned had lost popularity. Judy Garland and Donald O'Connor performed the song on the 1963 TV series, The Judy Garland Show, during a "tribute to vaudeville" medley.

Selected discography 
 Atlantic Records
 Bobby Short (1956)
 Atlantic 1230
 
 (audio sample via YouTube)

 Argo Records, London
 Hip Hooray for Neville Chamberlain (1974)
 Ian Whitcomb
 Argo ZDA162

Copyright 
 "At the Moving Picture Ball"
 Howard Johnson (words)
 Joseph Santly (music)
 Leo Feist, Inc., New York
 © 8 January 1920; E470306
 
 Sheet music, courtesy of Johns Hopkins University Libraries
 Note: The sheet music cover art (unsigned) – in red, white, and black – shows movie stars in burlesque attire at a masquerade party

References

External links
 Public domain version of the song at the internet archive

Songs about actors
Pop standards
Billy Murray (singer) songs
Novelty songs
Comedy songs
Year of song unknown